Ariha District is a district of the Idlib Governorate in northwestern Syria. Administrative centre is the city of Ariha. At the 2004 census, the district had a population of 175,994.

Sub-districts
The district of Ariha is divided into three sub-districts or nawāḥī (population as of 2004):
Ariha Subdistrict (ناحية أريحا): population 83,487.
Ihsim Subdistrict (ناحية إحسم): population 65,409.
Muhambal Subdistrict (ناحية محمبل): population 27,098.

References

 
Districts of Idlib Governorate